Valoyes is a surname. Notable people with the surname include:

César Valoyes (born 1984), Colombian footballer
Jimmy Valoyes (born 1984), Colombian footballer
Ubaldina Valoyes (born 1982), Colombian weightlifter